Honest Man: The Life of R. Budd Dwyer is a 2010 American documentary film by James Dirschberger that chronicles the Computer Technology Associates (CTA) scandal which led to the public suicide of R. Budd Dwyer, the Treasurer of the Commonwealth of Pennsylvania, in 1987.

The documentary features new interviews with Dwyer's family, friends, and colleagues. These interviews include Dwyer's widow Joanne (her last before her death in 2009) and William T. Smith.

The film premiered on October 9, 2010 at the Carmel Art & Film Festival in Carmel, California, where it received positive reviews. In November 2010, the film premiered in Harrisburg, Pennsylvania, the location of Dwyer's death, where it ran for one week at the Midtown Cinema. The director and the Dwyer family attended the screening and participated in a Q&A with the audience. In addition to further screenings around the country, the film was released on DVD on December 7, 2010. That same month it was broadcast on the Pennsylvania Cable Network. The film premiered on Amazon Video in December 2017.

Cast

References

External links
 
 
 

2010 films
American documentary films
R. Budd Dwyer
Documentary films about American politicians
Documentary films about crime in the United States
Documentary films about suicide
2010s English-language films
2010s American films